Lenin in 1918 (Lenin v 1918 godu) is a Soviet biographical drama film released in 1939. It gives the background of the Russian Civil War after the October Revolution.

The film was directed by Mikhail Romm with E. Aron and I. Simkov as co-directors. The script was written by Aleksei Kapler together with Taisiya Zlatogorova.

Cast
Boris Shchukin as Vladimir Lenin
Mikheil Gelovani as Joseph Stalin (removed from cut version)
Nikolay Bogolyubov as Kliment Voroshilov
Nikolay Cherkasov as Maxim Gorky
Vasily Markov as Felix Dzerzhinsky
Leonid Lyubashevsky as Yakov Sverdlov
Zoya Dobina as Nadezhda Krupskaya
Nikolay Okhlopkov as comrade Vasily, Lenin's assistant and bodyguard
Klavdiya Korobova as Natalya, Vasily's wife
Vasili Vanin as Kremlin commandant Matveyev
Yelena Muzil as Yevdokiya Ivanovna, Lenin's housekeeper
Iosif Tolchanov as Andrei Fyodorovich, physician
 Aleksandr Khokhlov as professor
Dmitry Orlov as Stepan Ivanovich Korobov, old St. Petersburg proletarian
Serafim Kozminsky as Bobylyov, Lenin's assistant
Nikolai Plotnikov as kulak from Tambov Governorate
Nikolai Svobodin as Valerian Rutkovsky, socialist revolutionary
Viktor Tretyakov as Ivan Grigoryevich Novikov, socialist revolutionary
Natalya Yefron as Fanny Kaplan
Aleksandr Shatov as Konstantinov, counter-revolutionary conspiracy organizer
Vladimir Solovyov as Sintsov, chekist-traitor
Sergei Antimonov as Polyakov (uncredited)
Viktor Kulakov as Nikolai Bukharin (uncut version, uncredited)
Rostislav Plyatt as military expert (uncut version, uncredited)
Georgy Bogatov as Vyacheslav Molotov (uncredited)
Anatoli Papanov as episode (uncredited)

Production
The shooting started on August 10, 1938 and lasted for eighty-seven days. Shchukin never saw Lenin in real life, but he did intense research, immersing himself in everything related to him. During the production of Lenin in 1918, Boris Shchukin constantly suffered from ill health. Exactly six months after his appearance in the film and while a sequel was being developed Shchukin died.

References

External links

1939 drama films
1939 films
1930s biographical drama films
1930s Russian-language films
Russian Civil War films
Films about Vladimir Lenin
Cultural depictions of Joseph Stalin
Films directed by Mikhail Romm
Films set in 1918
Mosfilm films
Russian biographical drama films
Russian black-and-white films
Soviet biographical drama films
Soviet black-and-white films